A vacutainer blood collection tube is a sterile glass or plastic test tube with a colored rubber stopper creating a vacuum seal inside of the tube, facilitating the drawing of a predetermined volume of liquid. Vacutainer tubes may contain additives designed to stabilize and preserve the specimen prior to analytical testing. Tubes are available with a safety-engineered stopper, with a variety of labeling options and draw volumes. The color of the top indicates the additives in the vial.

Vacutainer tubes were invented by Joseph Kleiner in 1949. Vacutainer is a registered trademark of Becton Dickinson, which manufactures and sells the tubes today.

Principles

The Vacutainer needle is double-ended: the inner end is encased in a thin rubber coating that prevents blood from leaking out if the Vacutainer tubes are changed during a multi-draw, and the outer end which is inserted into the vein. When the needle is screwed into the translucent plastic needle holder, the coated end is inside the holder.

When a tube is inserted into the holder, its rubber cap is punctured by this inner needle and the vacuum in the tube pulls blood through the needle and into the tube. The filled tube is then removed and another can be inserted and filled the same way. The amount of air evacuated from the tube predetermines how much blood will fill the tube before blood stops flowing.

Each tube is topped with a color-coded plastic or rubber cap. Tubes often include additives that mix with the blood when collected, and the color of each tube's plastic cap indicates which additives it contains.

Blood collection tubes expire because over time the vacuum is lost and blood will not be drawn into the tube when the needle punctures the cap.

Types of tubes 
 
Vacutainer tubes may contain additional substances that preserve blood for processing in a medical laboratory. Using the wrong tube may make the blood sample unusable for the intended purpose. These additives are typically thin film coatings applied using an ultrasonic nozzle.

The additives may include anticoagulants (EDTA, sodium citrate, heparin) or a gel with density between those of blood cells and blood plasma. Additionally, some tubes contain additives that preserve certain components of or substances within the blood, such as glucose. When a tube is centrifuged, the materials within are separated by density, with the blood cells sinking to the bottom and the plasma or serum accumulating at the top. Tubes containing gel can be easily handled and transported after centrifugation without the blood cells and serum mixing.

The meanings of the various colors are standardized across manufacturers.

The term order of draw refers to the sequence in which tubes should be filled. The needle which pierces the tubes can carry additives from one tube into the next, so the sequence is standardized so that any cross-contamination of additives will not affect laboratory results.

History
Vacutainer technology was developed in 1947 by Joseph Kleiner, and is currently marketed by Becton Dickinson (B-D). The Vacutainer was preceded by other vacuum-based phlebotomy technology such as the Keidel vacuum.

The plastic tube version, known as Vacutainer PLUS, was developed at B-D in the early 1990s by E. Vogler, D. Montgomery and G. Harper amongst others of the Surface Science Group as US patents 5344611, 5326535, 5320812, 5257633 and 5246666.

Vacutainers are widely used in phlebotomy in developed countries due to safety and ease of use. Vacutainers have the advantage of being prepared with additives, allowing easy multi-tube draws, and having a lower chance of hemolysis. In developing countries, it is still common to draw blood using a syringe or syringes.

References

External links
 Blood Collection Tube Coating Video

Medical equipment
Blood
Containers